Neresnica is a small town in the municipality of Kučevo, Serbia. It is made of four subregions: Komsa, Lunka, Popovac, Glozana and Kisela voda. According to the 2002 census, the town has a population of 2365 people.

References

Populated places in Braničevo District